Bruce Fox, Inc. is a designer and manufacturer of custom awards and branded displayable products, established in New Albany, Indiana, in 1938.

History

Early history
Bruce Fox, Inc. was founded in 1938 by a young metalsmith and sculptor, Bruce Fox. The company started as a producer of cast aluminum and sculpted copper decorative pieces and giftware in post-Depression America. Most of the designs of the company's early era featured themes from nature—leaves and animals were popular subject matter, many of which were tropically inspired in nature. Bruce Fox was creating the molds and patterns himself for production in his small metalworking shop, which included an aluminum and bronze foundry, as well as a number of casting and molding capabilities.

The 1950s and 1960s 
Throughout this period, the company's focus was on the retail giftware and decor market. The company ran a retail store at its factory location in New Albany, Indiana for a number of years. In the early part of this era, the company thrived on the appeal of aluminum as a relatively exotic metal.

Bruce Fox died in 1960, and with his passing, the company's focus began to shift. The demand for the company's giftware line was fading in the early 1960s, as aluminum became increasingly familiar and it no longer held the appeal as unique material. Faced with this receding retail market, the company turned to commercial markets for sales of its product. In the mid-1960s, the company began producing commercial goods, specifically a number of point-of-sale and retail signs. This foray into commercial sales led to opportunities for the company's product to serve as recognition awards and employee gifts. By the end of the '60s, a majority of the company's activities were related to these commercial ventures.

The 1970s and 1980s 
The company sold the rights to its giftware line to Wilton Armetale in 1973 and focused entirely on its commercial business. During this period, the reach of Bruce Fox's products had spread from regional to national interests. The company was selling its products as a wholesaler through independent salespeople, as well as through direct channels. A variety of manufacturing capabilities—such as metal casting & fabrication, woodworking, and cast urethane—provided the media for the company to produce custom awards, plaques, and trophies designed exclusively for its customers.

The 1990s and 2000s 
To this point, the company had functioned primarily as a make & ship factory, where products were ordered, manufactured, and shipped in bulk to a single location for subsequent distribution.  Customer demand for value-added distribution services led the company to establish AsemPac, Inc., a wholly owned subsidiary of The Fox Group, which was incorporated in 1998 as the holding company for Bruce Fox, Inc. and AsemPac, Inc., also located in New Albany, Indiana. AsemPac functions as the principal center for the inventory, final assembly, personalization, and global fulfillment functions on behalf of Bruce Fox, Inc.

It was early in this period that the company also transitioned exclusively to represented sales, primarily through independent distributors in the promotional products marketplace.  The company joined both international trade organizations associated with the promotional products industry—Promotional Products International Association (PPAI), and Advertising Specialty Institute (ASI).

Recent history
Bruce Fox, Inc. expanded its capabilities with the 2014 purchase of Florida-based DYR/Design Your Recognition, a manufacturer of awards and plaques serving the promotional products market.

The company currently provides a wide range of solutions for products that serve a number of purposes, including stock and custom awards & recognition, commemorative corporate gifts, signage & identity, and point-of-sale displays. End-user customers include a wide range of Fortune 500 companies, government agencies and international fraternal & civic organizations.

References

External links

Design companies established in 1938
Companies based in Indiana
Manufacturing companies established in 1938
1938 establishments in Indiana